William Russell (9 November 1798 – 30 January 1850) of Brancepeth Castle in County Durham was a British Whig politician. He sat in the House of Commons between 1822 and 1832.

Life
He was the son of Matthew Russell and his wife Elizabeth Tennyson, and grandson of the wealthy William Russell of Brancepeth Castle. He was educated at Eton College and matriculated at St John's College, Cambridge in 1818.

In politics
Russell was elected at a by-election in 1822 as one of the two Members of Parliament (MPs) for borough of Saltash in Cornwall. He held that seat until the 1826 general election, when he was returned as an MP for the borough of Bletchingley in Surrey. 

He resigned the Bletchingley seat in 1827 (by taking the Chiltern Hundreds) to stand at a by-election for County Durham. It was caused by the elevation of the Whig John George Lambton to the House of Lords.

On his home ground, Russell was returned without a contest. He was the county’s richest commoner, seen as a Canningite. The Marquess of Londonderry had a political reason — his man Sir Henry Hardinge was at that moment unavailable — for stepping aside as a backer of another candidate. Charles Tennyson, his uncle, ran his campaign in the constituency, with Robert William Mills, his steward. On election day John Allan (1778–1844) of Blackwell Grange, son of his grandfather's banking partner Robert Allan, and Archibald Cochrane, proposed him, and Russell spoke in favour of Catholic emancipation and reform of the Corn Laws. He held the County Durham seat until the constituency was divided at the 1832 general election.

Russell was High Sheriff of Durham in 1841.

References

External links 
 
 

1798 births
1850 deaths
Whig (British political party) MPs for English constituencies
People from County Durham (before 1974)
Politicians from Tyne and Wear
UK MPs 1820–1826
Members of the Parliament of the United Kingdom for Saltash
UK MPs 1826–1830
UK MPs 1830–1831
UK MPs 1831–1832
High Sheriffs of Durham